János Somogyi (21 January 1922 – 31 January 1998) was a Hungarian racewalker. He competed in the men's 50 kilometres walk at the 1956 Summer Olympics.

References

1922 births
1998 deaths
Athletes (track and field) at the 1956 Summer Olympics
Hungarian male racewalkers
Olympic athletes of Hungary
Place of birth missing